Simon Broke (fl. 1393–1406) of Gloucester, was an English politician.

He was a Member (MP) of the Parliament of England for Gloucester in 1393, 1399, 1402 and 1406.

References

Year of birth missing
Year of death missing
14th-century English politicians
People from Gloucester
Members of the Parliament of England (pre-1707) for Gloucester